Saudagar may refer to:
 Saudagar (1973 film), a 1973 Bollywood film directed by Sudhendu Roy
 Saudagar (1991 film), a 1991 Bollywood film directed by Subhash Ghai
 Sapno Ka Saudagar, a 1968 film directed by Mahesh Kaul

People
Momin Ansari, an Urdu-speaking Muslim community also known as Saudagar
Osman Ali Sadagar (1856–1948), Bengali-Assamese politician and educationist

See also 
 Punjabi Saudagaran-e-Delhi